División de Honor B may refer to:
División de Plata de Balonmano, the second-level handball league in Spain
División de Honor B de Rugby, the second Spanish league competition for rugby union clubs

See also
División de Honor (disambiguation)